Chionarctia nivea is a moth of the family Erebidae. It was described by Édouard Ménétries in 1859. It is found in Russia (Middle Amur, Primorye, southern Sakhalin, Kunashir), China, Korea and Japan.

References

Spilosomina
Moths described in 1859
Moths of Japan